Salvador Guillermo Allende Gossens  (26 June 1908 – 11 September 1973) was a Chilean physician and politician, known as the first Marxist to become president of a Latin American country through open elections.

This is a Salvador Allende bibliography, including writings, speeches, letters and others.

Speeches

See also 

 Marxist bibliography

References

External links 
 
 
 Salvador Allende at the Marxists Internet Archive

Works by Salvador Allende
Allende, Salvador
Communist books